Methazole (C9H6Cl2N2O3) is an obsolete herbicide in the family of herbicides known as oxadiazolones.  It was used as a post-emergent treatment for controlling weeds.

References

Herbicides
Oxadiazolidines
Chloroarenes